MacCrindle Shipbuilding Ltd was a shipbuilder in Ardrossan, Scotland.

History
Ardrossan Shipyard built the South or New Shipyard in about 1916, with the first keel plate laid there in 1918. The yard covered  and had five building berths capable of accommodating 400-500 ft boats of up to 9000 tons. The shipyard allowed vessels to be launched directly into the Firth of Clyde. 

Vessels launched from the south yard:-

The yard closed in 1930. By 1969, some of the land was acquired by the McCrindle group, who continued the tradition of small shipbuilding in Ardrossan. McCrindle Shipbuilding was formed in 1976. They took over the yard number sequence of the earlier Ardrossan Dockyard, and became the last operating shipbuilder in the town.

McCrindle Shipbuilding finished their last ship, the trawler Spes Melior V, in 1990.

Ships built

Footnotes

North Ayrshire
Defunct shipbuilding companies of Scotland